These lists comprises all players who have participated in at least one competitive match (MLS regular season, MLS Cup Playoffs, U.S. Open Cup, MLS is Back Tournament, CONCACAF Champions League) for the Philadelphia Union since the team's first Major League Soccer season in 2010. Players who were on the roster but never played a first team game are not listed.

Regular season players
Major League Soccer clubs are allowed a roster of 30 players at any one time during the MLS season.

All statistics are for the MLS regular season games only, and are correct through March 18, 2023.

Outfield players

Goalkeepers

MLS Cup Playoffs players

All statistics are for the MLS Cup Playoff games only, and are correct through November 5, 2022.

Outfield players

Goalkeepers

MLS Is Back Tournament Playoffs players

All statistics are for the MLS Is Back Tournament Playoff games only, and are correct through August 5, 2020.

Outfield players

Goalkeepers

CONCACAF Champions League players

All statistics are for the CONCACAF Champions League games only, and are correct through March 15, 2023.

Outfield players

Goalkeepers

U.S. Open Cup players
All statistics are for the U.S. Open Cup games only, and are correct through May 10, 2022.

Outfield players

Goalkeepers

Sources
http://www.philadelphiaunion.com/stats

Philadelphia Union
 
Association football player non-biographical articles